The 1995 Governor General's Literary Awards were presented by Roméo LeBlanc, Governor General of Canada on November 14 at the Winter Garden Theatre in Toronto.  Each winner received a cheque for $10,000 and a copy of their books specially bound by master bookbinder Pierre Ouvard.

English

French

Governor General's Awards
Governor General's Awards
Governor General's Awards